Sukth is a village and a former municipality in the Durrës County, western Albania. At the 2015 local government reform it became a subdivision of the municipality Durrës. The population at the 2011 census was 15,966.

The village is divided by the Erzen river is into two districts, namely in Sukth i Ri and Sukth i vjeter. Sukth is located about three kilometres north of the historic market town of Shijak. The Adriatic Sea is only seven kilometres away.

Sukth municipality consisted of Sukth, Hamallaj, Kulla, Perlat, Vadardha and Rrushkull villages. The last mayor was Sherif Fortuzi.

Sport
FK Sukthi

Notable people 
Below are notable personalities born in Sukth or that spent most of their lives in Sukth:

Noizy, singer, rapper
Renato Arapi, football player
Elidion Mara, football player

References

Administrative units of Durrës
Former municipalities in Durrës County
Towns in Albania
Populated places disestablished in 2015